Afghanistan has three railway lines in the north of the country. The first is between Mazar-i-Sharif and the border town of Hairatan in Balkh province, which then connects with Uzbek Railways of Uzbekistan (opened 2011). The second links Torghundi in Herat province with Turkmen Railways of Turkmenistan (opened 1960). The third is between Turkmenistan and Aqina in Faryab province of Afghanistan (opened in 2016), which extends south to the city of Andkhoy. The country currently lacks a passenger rail service, but a new rail link from Herat to Khaf in Iran for both cargo and passengers was recently completed. Passenger service is also proposed in Hairatan – Mazar-i-Sharif section and Mazar-i-Sharif – Aqina section.

Afghanistan's rail network is still in the developing stage. The current rail lines are to be extended in the near future, the plans include lines for cargo traffic as well as passenger transportation. Afghanistan's neighbors have been improving their own railway networks during the early 21st century. The main plan is to use Afghanistan to connect by rail the four subcontinents of Asia.

History

Kabul tramway

The December 1922 issue of The Locomotive magazine includes: "Travellers from Afghanistan state a railway is being laid down for a distance of some six miles from Kabul to the site of the new city of Darulaman, and also that some of the rolling stock for it is being manufactured in the Kabul workshops". The August 1928 issue of The Locomotive magazine mentions: "The only railway at present in Afghanistan is five miles long, between Kabul and Darulaman". The tramway closed (date unknown), and was dismantled in the 1940s, but  the locomotives were held, outdoors, at the National Museum of Afghanistan in Darulaman.

Proposed railways
Over the 19th century and a half, plenty of proposals have been made about building railways in Afghanistan. In 1885, the New York Times wrote about plans for connecting the Russian Transcaspian Railway, then under construction, with British India via Sarakhs, Herat, and Kandahar. When completed, the project would allow British officers to travel from London to India, mostly by rail, in 11 to 12 days (crossing the English Channel, the Black Sea, and the Caspian Sea by boat).

About 1928, proposals were put forward for a railway to link Jalalabad with Kabul, eventually connecting to the (then) Indian system at Peshawar.  Lines to join Kabul with Kandahar and Herat would follow later.  Owing to political upheavals these plans were not implemented.

In 1930s, the Japanese Ministry of Railways proposed Eurasian high speed rail from Tokyo to Paris via Busan (through Korea Strait undersea tunnel), Beijing, Baotou, Turfan, Kashgar, Kabul, Tehran, Baghdad, Istanbul with connection to Berlin and Rome but never realised at the beginning of the World War II.

Industrial railways
In the 1950s a hydroelectric power station was built at Surobi, east of Kabul. Three Henschel four-wheel  narrow gauge diesel-hydraulic locomotives built in 1951 (works numbers 24892, 24993, 24994) were supplied to the power station.

In 1979 mining and construction locomotive builder Bedia Maschinenfabrik of Bonn supplied five D35/6 two axle diesel-hydraulic  narrow gauge locomotives, works numbers 150–154, to an unknown customer in Afghanistan.

Timeline

2019 

 Aqina – Andkhoy railway line extension opened.

Track gauge 
For strategic reasons, past Afghan governments averted the construction of railways which could aid foreign interference in Afghanistan by Britain or Russia. The gauges in adjacent countries were: 
 Iran, to the west, and China, to the east: 
 Pakistan, to the south and east: 
 Turkmenistan, Uzbekistan, and Tajikistan, to the north: .

In 2010, the international  "standard gauge" was chosen to be the country's railway gauge. The Khaf-Herat railway, a joint project between Afghanistan and Iran completed in  2020, was built to that gauge. It links Turkey and Europe with Iranian ports in the Persian Gulf.

Railway stations 
There are currently no passenger services or stations in Afghanistan. If any of the various cross-border links are completed and opened to passenger service, new stations will have to be built.

Proposed 
Details of the preliminary list of stations to be served, which circle the central mountains of Afghanistan are available.

National Rail Authority 
The Afghan government planned to form a railway construction commission with technical cooperation provided by the European Commission, which was discussed at the G8 meeting in July 2011. The commission would be responsible for supervising construction of a rail network within the country and its connection with the country's neighbors. In October 2011, the Asian Development Bank approved funding for Afghanistan's national rail authority. The Afghanistan Railway Authority has a website but, as of August 2017, there is very little on it. It does state that Afghanistan Railway Law (12 chapters and 105 clauses) was drafted in February 2013 and is awaiting approval from "relevant institutions". Training has been provided by the United States Army's Afghanistan Railroad Advisory Team (ARAT).

Current railways and future plans

Afghanistan–Uzbekistan rail service 

In the early 1980s, the Soviet Union built an approximately  rail line from Termez in Uzbekistan to Kheyrabad in Afghanistan, crossing the Amu Darya river on the Afghanistan–Uzbekistan Friendship Bridge.

In January 2010, construction began on a  extension line between Afghanistan and Uzbekistan; this line is also Russian gauge as the first one built by the Soviets. The line, which starts from Hairatan to Maulana Jalaluddin Balkhi International Airport in the northern Afghan city of Mazar-i-Sharif, was completed and is operated by Uzbekistan's national railway Uzbekiston Temir Yullari for a three-year-term until Afghanistan's own railways department takes over. By December 2010, it began carrying construction materials for other reconstruction projects in Afghanistan. The first freight services began running around August 2011.

Uzbekistan has pledged in 2018 to part fund a major  rail link from Mazar-i-Sharif west to Herat, which could create a route from Iran via Herat to Central Asia and potentially China.

Afghanistan–Turkmenistan rail service 

A  line extends from Serhetabat in Turkmenistan to the town of Torghundi in Afghanistan. An upgrade of this Soviet-built line dating back to the 1960s, using Russian gauge, began in 2007. In accordance with earlier decisions, the line is likely to be standard gauge, with break of gauge at Torghundi. In April 2018 it was decided by the Turkmen government to build a railway from Galkynysh Gas Field in the direction of Afghanistan, towards Torghundi.

Another rail line was opened further east in November 2016, connecting Aqina in Faryab province via Ymamnazar with Atamyrat/Kerki in Turkmenistan. Work on a  extension to Andkhoy soon began, which was completed in January 2021.

It is planned to become part of a rail corridor through northern Afghanistan, connecting it via Sheberghan to Mazar-i Sharif and on to the border with Tajikistan, although it is unclear when this will happen.

Afghanistan–Iran rail service 

The Iranian railhead closest to the Afghan border is at Khaf near Mashhad, and this is a  standard gauge freight line. Since 2002, Afghan and Iranian officials have been working to extend this line east to Herat in Afghanistan.

Details of the route are as follows (taken from Google Earth/Bing Maps). The new route commences in Iran at a junction at Khaf station with a mineral branch where a balloon loop is provided for international locos to turn round. The route travels lower down the mountainside than the mine branch and it appears there has already been a diversion possibly to avoid mine workings/tailings. There are sidings and passing loops on this section. The route continues along the southern flank of the mountain range crossing many alluvial fans before entering a wide valley that leads to the summit. The rail route makes use of a section of Iran that juts into Afghanistan and remains on the north side of the water course. Near the end of the valley the railway seems to have a passing loop and wye just before the border at the summit cutting though details on Google Earth are indistinct and not present at all on Bing Maps, which generally has more updated maps. The railway now heads north east through foothills on the  contour approximately, north of the villages of Faruk Aqa and Rebat-e-Tork to reach a sandy plain forming a part of the wide Hari Rud river valley. The route crosses the  Hari Rud flood plain diagonally on embankments with a  bridge over the main channel.
 
The Khaf-Herat rail route has four sections, two in Iran and two in Afghanistan. Within Iran, section 1, running from Khaf to Sangan, was completed in September 2016. Section 2, from Sangan to the Iran-Afghanistan border at Shamtiq, was completed in October 2017. Section 3, running within Afghanistan from the border at Shamtiq–Jono to the town of Ghurian was also completed. Section 4 is the line from Jono to Herat which is being supported by Italy. Work is started on this line in December 2000, which ends at Herat International Airport, the fourth major airport in Afghanistan.

India and Afghanistan are working on extending this rail route from Herat to Mazar-i-Sharif. Mazar-i-Sharif is already linked with Uzbekistan and Tajikistan via rail routes. Herat also is already linked with Turkmenistan via rail and road routes. India is also finalizing a plan to construct a  railway line that will connect the port of Chabahar in Iran, being built with Indian help, to the mineral-rich Hajigak region of Afghanistan. As far back as 2011, seven Indian companies had acquired rights to mine central Afghanistan's Hajigak region, which contain Asia's largest deposit of iron ore. The Government of India has pledged to spend $2bn in developing supporting infrastructure.

In May 2016, during Indian Prime Minister Narendra Modi's trip to Iran, an agreement was signed to develop two berths at Chabahar port and to build a rail connection from Chabahar to the existing Iranian railway network. The link line would connect a point somewhere near the town of Bam to Chabahar port, as part of North–South Transport Corridor. Ircon International, a subsidiary of the state-owned Indian Railways, has been tasked with this project. The establishment of the port of Chabahar's connection to the country's railway plan, is under study and consideration. With completion of the Kerman–Bam-Zahedan railway and its future connection to the port of Chabahar, this port will connect to the Trans-Iranian Railway, and thus to both Afghanistan and Central Asia.

The works on remaining  section of the project between Rahzanak and Herat is in progress. The works on both sides are done as development assistance to Afghanistan by Iran. The railway is part of the planned Five Nations Railway Corridor between China and Iran through Afghanistan, Tajikistan, Kyrgyzstan. The new Khaf – Rahzanak rail line continues from Khaf to Torbat-e Heydarieh where it links with Mashhad – Bafq railway line a crucial rail link opened in 2009 which connects port city, Bandar Abbas in Persian Gulf with north eastern city of Mashhad and from there with Turkmenistan through Sarakhs.

Afghanistan–Pakistan rail service 

Two broad gauge  Pakistan Railways lines with steep gradients terminate on the border at Chaman and Torkham. In July 2010, Pakistan and Afghanistan signed a Memorandum of understanding for going ahead with the laying of rail tracks between the two countries. The rail tracks would link Quetta in Pakistan with Kandahar in Afghanistan and Peshawar in Pakistan with Jalalabad in Afghanistan. The project soon fell off.

On May 29, 2012, the section from Chaman in Pakistan to Spin Boldak in Afghanistan was approved, though this never started.

On February 22, 2020, the first cargo train bound for Afghanistan left Karachi, Pakistan with a load of containers. Pakistan Railways Chairman Habib-ur-Rehman Gilani inaugurated the train on Saturday which departed from the Pakistan International Container Terminal in Karachi with 35 containers on board for the country's southwest Chaman city bordering Afghanistan. From there, the goods will be shifted across the border via road, the Nation reported.
On 30-12-20,
Pakistan signed a joint appeal letter Tuesday seeking a $4.8 billion loan from international financial institutions for a Trans-Afghan railway line project with Uzbekistan and Afghanistan.

The rail link would connect Pakistan and Uzbekistan via Afghanistan and later the Central Asian countries.

Prime Minister Imran Khan signed the letter on behalf of Pakistan for the mega project, according to Abdul Razak Dawood, adviser to the prime minister on commerce and investment.

"Today, the prime minister signed a letter for a joint approach with Afghanistan & Uzbekistan for asking international financial agencies to finance the railway from Pakistan to Uzbekistan through Afghanistan. This fits well with our vision for trade and connectivity through Afghanistan to the Central Asia Republics," Dawood tweeted.

Afghanistan–Tajikistan rail service 

A multination rail link was planned between Afghanistan and Tajikistan in 2013. The Tajikistan section has been partly implemented in 2016.

In 2018 a  extension from Kolkhozobod in Tajikistan to the Afghan border town of Sher Khan Bandar in Kunduz Province was approved with construction expected to start that year.

North–South Corridor 
In September 2010, China Metallurgical Group Corporation (MCC) signed an agreement with the Afghan Minister of Mines to investigate construction of a north–south railway across Afghanistan, running from Mazar-i-Sharif to Kabul and then to the eastern border town of Torkham. MCC was recently awarded a copper mining concession at Mes Aynak which would be linked to this railway. MCC is constructing a   gauge railway line that will link Kabul with Uzbekistan in the north and Pakistan in the east.

Breaks of gauge 
The initial phase of railway construction from 2010 sees the creation of five break-of-gauge stations.

 Kandahar  / 
 Khyber Pass  / 
 Torghundi  / 
 Mazar-i-Sharif  / 
 Sher Khan Bandar  / 

In late 2016 updates, there are multiple breaks-of-gauge. These include: / in the northern area, and // at Herat.

See also

 Transport in Afghanistan
 Khyber train safari
 Khyber Pass Railway
 Eurasian Land Bridge
 North-South Transport Corridor
 Ashgabat agreement, a Multimodal transport agreement signed by India, Oman, Iran, Turkmenistan, Uzbekistan and Kazakhstan, for creating an international transport and transit corridor facilitating transportation of goods between Central Asia and the Persian Gulf.
 Broad gauge
 Dual gauge

References

Further reading
 Grantham, A. Railways in Afghanistan
 
 Afghanistan demain le rail pp. 6–14 + 27 pictures – vie du rail – n°1542 – 09/05/1976

External links

 UN Map
 UNHCR Atlas Map